"Why Does It Have to Be (Wrong or Right)" is a song written by Randy Sharp and Donny Lowery and recorded by American country music group Restless Heart. It was released in April 1987 as the third single from the album, Wheels. The song was Restless Heart's third number one song on the country chart.  The single went to number one for one week and spent a total of 25 weeks on the charts.

The B-side, "Hummingbird", was later released by Ricky Skaggs in 1990 from his album Kentucky Thunder.

Music video
The music video was directed by George Bloom III and premiered in mid-1987.

Charts

Weekly charts

Year-end charts

References

1987 singles
Restless Heart songs
Songs written by Randy Sharp
Song recordings produced by Scott Hendricks
RCA Records Nashville singles
1986 songs
Songs written by Donny Lowery